Eugene Clark (March 21, 1906 – February 1981) was an American rower. He competed in the men's coxless pair event at the 1932 Summer Olympics, with his twin brother, Thomas.

References

External links
 

1906 births
1975 deaths
American male rowers
Olympic rowers of the United States
Rowers at the 1932 Summer Olympics
People from Glenolden, Pennsylvania